Betta dimidiata is a species of gourami endemic to Kalimantan Barat in Indonesia.

References

External links
Betta albimarginata

dimidiata
Freshwater fish of Indonesia
Taxa named by Tyson R. Roberts
Fish described in 1989